Justus or Just was the fifth bishop of Vienne and lived in the 2nd century. Justus was known also from some spurious letters attributed to Pope Pius I.

References

2nd-century bishops in Gaul
Bishops of Vienne
Year of birth unknown